Statistics of the Scottish Football League in season 1949–50.

Scottish League Division A

Scottish League Division B

See also
1949–50 in Scottish football

References

 
Scottish Football League seasons